Sandford is a small hamlet in the New Forest National Park of Hampshire, England. The nearest town to Sandford is Ringwood, which is approximately 2.6 miles (4.1 km) north from the hamlet.

Villages in Hampshire
Ringwood, Hampshire